Billy "Crash" Craddock's Christmas Favorites is a Christmas album recorded by Billy "Crash" Craddock. It was released in 2006 on the Cee Cee label.

Track listing
"An Old Christmas Card" 
"Pretty Paper" 
"Santa Looked a Lot Like Daddy"
"Let It Snow" 
"Silver Bells" 
"Santa Claus Is Coming to Town" 
"Blue Christmas" 
"Away in a Manger"
"Winter Wonderland"
"Beautiful Star of Bethlehem"

Billy "Crash" Craddock albums
2006 Christmas albums
Christmas albums by American artists
Country Christmas albums